Jude Gold (also credited as Judah Gold) is an American guitarist who has toured with Jefferson Starship since 2012 and has toured with Kristin Chenoweth, JGB (formerly the Jerry Garcia Band), Eddie Money, 2 Live Crew, Jeff Berlin, and more. He has been the Los Angeles editor of Guitar Player magazine since 2001, with numerous cover stories to his credit.

Career
Jude Gold is a graduate from University of California, Berkeley. He has performed with Metallica's Kirk Hammett, 2 Live Crew, David Grisman and The String Cheese Incident. He has also toured with JGB (formerly known as the Jerry Garcia Band, featuring original members Melvin Seals, Donny Baldwin, Gloria Jones, and Jackie LaBranch) and Kristin Chenoweth, in addition to BX3, a group made up of bass players Stu Hamm, Jeff Berlin, and Billy Sheehan. His credits include playing on Miguel Migs' Outside the Skyline and Get Salted Vol. 2, as well as Hed Kandi's Beach House; Gold is also mentioned in the liner notes of Lee Ritenour's 6 String Theory.

In October 2012, Gold joined Jefferson Starship as lead guitarist. He has performed in Europe, Brazil, America, Japan, Mexico, Scandinavia, and Canada with the band Gold played guitar on the Academy Award-nominated documentary, Daughter from Danang.

He is a well-known guitar journalist, and the subjects of his writing and interviews include Steve Lukather, Third Eye Blind, Slash, Brad Paisley
and many Guitar Player magazine "Master Classes" (a popular column of Guitar Player). Gold has also written for Relix, Rumble, Frets, and Bass Player magazines.

Gold is director of the Guitar Institute of Technology in Hollywood.

Since 2015, Gold has been the host of a guitar podcast called No Guitar Is Safe where he interviews famous guitarists while they are both playing guitars.

Credits
2 Live Crew, Shake a Lil' Somethin''' (Guitar)
Miguel Migs, Outside the Skyline (Guitar)
JGB, Welcome to our World (For Members Only) (Guitar)
Lee Ritenour, 6 String Theory (Liner Notes)
Hed Kandi, Beach House (Guitar)
Miguel Migs, Get Salted, Vol. 2 (Guitar) *Miguel Migs, Those Things (Guitar) *Stuart Hamm, Outbound (Guitar) *Stuart Hamm, Live Stu x 2 (Guitar) *Stuart Hamm, Just Outside of Normal'' (Guitar)

References

External links

American rock guitarists
American male journalists
American music journalists
American music critics
Jefferson Starship members
American podcasters
Living people
Year of birth missing (living people)